Rodolfo Betinotti (born 7 October 1932) is an Argentine former footballer. He played in one match for the Argentina national football team in 1959. He was also part of Argentina's squad for the 1959 South American Championship that took place in Ecuador.

References

External links
 

1932 births
Living people
Argentine footballers
Argentina international footballers
Place of birth missing (living people)
Association football defenders
Club Atlético Atlanta footballers
All Boys footballers
CA Excursionistas players